Eugraptoblemma is a genus of moths of the family Noctuidae. The genus was erected by Warren in 1913.

Species
Eugraptoblemma pictalis (Hampson, 1898) Khasis
Eugraptoblemma rosealis (Hampson, 1896) Bhutan
Eugraptoblemma utsugii Kishida, 2010 Japan

References

Acontiinae